Hembury Castle is an Iron Age Hill fort situated close to Tythecott, south of Buckland Brewer in Devon. The fort is situated on a promontory off the East of a large hill at some 137 Metres above Sea Level.

References

Hill forts in Devon